Shehroz Sabzwari is a Pakistani actor and model who is known for his role in the film Khulay Aasman Ke Neechay directed by Javed Sheikh. He has the lead role in the 2016 television drama series Deewana produced by Hum TV.

Personal life 
He married actress Syra Yousuf on 21 October 2012 and their Nikkah took place in Karachi in a private ceremony. They announced their separation on 29 February 2020. They later announced their divorce. On 31 May 2020, Sabzwari married model Sadaf Kanwal.

Filmography

Television

References

External links 

 

Living people
Pakistani male models
Pakistani male television actors
Male actors from Karachi
1985 births